Yatouma Diop (born 25 September 1972) is a Malian footballer. He played in 14 matches for the Mali national football team from 1993 to 1996. He was also named in Mali's squad for the 1994 African Cup of Nations tournament.

References

External links

External links
 

1972 births
Living people
Malian footballers
Mali international footballers
1994 African Cup of Nations players
Place of birth missing (living people)
Association football defenders
21st-century Malian people
Stade Malien players